Swargakkunnile Kuriakose is an Indian Malayalam-language psycho suspense thriller film directed by Emmanuvel N. K. and starring Rajeesh Puttad in the title role. The film is produced by Advocate Cyrill Skaria Pailithanam under the banner of Friday Reel Movies, written by Ramabhadran Thamburan and Emmanuvel N. K.  The film also stars Sindhya Viswanath, Jaya Babu, Venkurinji Gopinath, Jo Garner, Suresh Babu and Biju Madhavan. The film background score and soundtrack were composed by Linu Keezhillam and Vishnu Siva, Shiju S. Vismaya and Bineesh Puthuppanam penned all the lyrics while art direction was handled by Sachin K. Santhosh and edited by Jobin Inchappara. it is a 110-minute commercial movie.

This movie is based on a unique theme which Malayalam cinema has not focused on till now. This movie will be a great inspiration for the people who love movies and lacking confidence to take striking and ravishing movies which are socially important. The film released across Kerala on 29 June 2018 and is still running successfully in Kerala.

Plot 
Kuriakose was born in the village of Swargakunnu. His parents are farmers, and he doesn’t have any siblings. Being a single son, his parents brought him up with utmost care and love. but he grew up as a coward, afraid of the dark and death. Even after passing age 30, Kuriakose remains lazy, refusing to go to work or leave his home. He was shocked to hear of the death of his friend and former classmate, Biju. This constant fear causes him to believe that his cholesterol and BP is high, so he makes a juice out of chili peppers as advised in Social media and health magazines to lower them. However, this juice causes him to have severe pain. His parents and neighbours try to take him to the hospital, but Kuriakose refuses to go because of his fear. The constant fear, shame and pressure from his family forces him to leave home, mentally unstable. On his way to the junction, Kuriakose sees the poster of missing motivator and singer, Chandra Das, causing him more fear.

His Pastor and the church prays and searches for Kuriakose without informing police. But Kuriakose, in his mental instability falls into a pit. In that same pit, he sees the body of Chandra Das. Fearful, he hides the body with dried leaves and mud. This experience helped Kuriakose finally to gain some courage. Meanwhile, Sandhya, a girl who is tortured by her father and his friends, runs away from home and coincidentally falls into the same pit.

In the pit they were trapped for around four days. After hearing Sandhya’s past, Kuriakose decided to support her and live together. Kids playing next to the pit found Kuriakose and Sandhya trapped there. The villagers rescue them and the police recover Chandra Das' dead body from the pit. Kuriakose, having found a suicide note, hands it over to the police as evidence. Kuriakose's mother and father object to his union with Sandhya as she is from a different caste, but the Pastor defends them. Sandya’s father also tries to stop them, but the reformed Kuriakose’s decision was strong and he decided to live in Swargakunnu together with Sandhya.

Cast 
 Rajeesh Puttad as Kuriakose
 Sindhya Viswanath as Sandhya
 Jaya Babu as Eliyamma
 Venkurinji Gopinath as Kunju
 Jo Garner as Pastor
 K. C. Vijayamma as Jancy (Friend)
 Suresh Babu as Chandradas (Poet)
 Biju Madhavan as Church Secretary
 Hareesh Purushothaman as Church Member
Miya Ashraf as Sandhya's Father
 Anil Elavoor as Chakyar
 Jithin Mathew Babu as Jibin, Church Member
Sruthi Simon as Friend
 Evan Emmanuvel as Baby actor

References

 https://www.manoramaonline.com/movies/new-releases/2018/06/02/Swargakkunnile-Kuriakose-malayalam-movie.html Malayala Manorama Retrieved 2 June 2018
 /http://www.thehindu.com/todays-paper/tp-features/tp-metroplus/for-the-love-of-cinema/article19513922.ece   The Hindu News Paper; Retrieved 18 August 2017
 https://malayalam.filmibeat.com/features/article-about-malayalam-movie-swargakkunnile-kuriakose-043325.html filmibeat malayalam; dated 2 June 2018
https://malayalam.filmibeat.com/preview/swargakkunnile-kuriakose-psycho-suspense-thriller-042493.htmlmibeat malayalam;  ; dated 27 April 2018
https://metromatinee.com/live/tag/swargakkunnile-kuriakose/ Metromatinee Article; dated 17 April 2018

External links

 `http://www.thehindu.com/todays-paper/tp-features/tp-metroplus/panning-on-a-passion/article2599167.ece
 http://travelzozo.info/swargakkunnile-kuriakose-review-by-psychological-counselor-and-film-critic-mr-sivadas_HWEQQ0gzjA1o.html

2018 films
2010s Malayalam-language films
2018 psychological thriller films
Indian psychological thriller films